La Banda ("the band") is a Spanish-language singing competition series created by Ricky Martin and Simon Cowell, and produced by Ricky Martin. The goal of the series is to look for talented young teens to make the next musical phenomenon. The show was renewed for season 2, in the search for the next Latin boy and girl band. The judges in Season 2 were Wisin, Laura Pausini and Mario Domm.

Season 2 premiered on September 11, 2016, and concluded on December 11, 2016. The second season ended with a band mixed of three boys and two girls; composed of Brian Cruz (16), (Cuba), Taishmara Rivera (16), (Puerto Rico), Christian Castro (22), (Puerto Rico), Danelly Hoyer (21), (Mexico), and Garmandy Candelario (21), (Dominican Republic). The band is called MIX5.

Participants 
The young people listed below were voted through to the competition by at least two of the three star judges of the show. Their ages at the time of their televised audition and their Latin American countries of ethnic or national origin are also displayed.

The top 57 participants showed who passed the audition but failed to continue towards the second phase of the competition.

Top 57

Top 36

Top 24

Top 16

The final 5 that won the competition were Brian Cruz, Taishmara Rivera, Christian Castro, Danelly Hoyer and Garmandy Candelario.

Results

Results summary 
Contestants' color key:

Note: The eliminations are based on the previous weeks' performances and the viewers' votes each week.

October 30 – Female Live Show. 

The first live show was the girls from the top 16. They all performed solo songs as well as two group performances. The best group is safe, and the other risks elimination. In the second live show, the first band from last week confirmed that Taishmara and Veronica were saved by the fans. Sofia was saved by the judges, and Aimee was the first finalist eliminated.

November 6 – Male Live Show. 

The second live show was the boys from the top 16. They all performed solo songs as well as two group performances. The best group gets immunity, and the other needs the fans to vote for them in order to avoid elimination. On November 13, 2016, it was confirmed that Brian and Felix were saved by the fans. Abel was saved by the judges, and Edward was the second finalist eliminated.

November 13 – Girls VS Boys. 
At the end of the group presentations, the public votes saved Felix and Brian, and then the judges chose Abel to stay. So therefore, Edward was eliminated.

November 20 – Mixed groups. 
In the bottom three, fans were able to vote through the Univision Connecta app for their favorite live. Danelly was saved by public vote, then the judges chose Megamy to stay. So therefore, Sofia was eliminated.  CNCO came to perform their hit, Reggaeton Lento.

November 27 – Quarterfinal 

It was announced the previous week that 2 contestants will be eliminated. In the fifth live show, after the group presentations, it was revealed that Abdiel was the first of the two finalists eliminated. Alondra, Megamy, and Veronica were at risk of elimination. The public vote saved Alondra, and the judges chose  Megamy to stay. So therefore, Veronica was the second finalist eliminated.

December 4 – Semifinal 

This time, they would announce the eliminated contestant after the opening of the show. Abel, Felix, Zhamira, and Danelly were risk of elimination. The public votes saved both Zhamira and Felix. Then the judges choose Danelly, and so therefore, Abel was next finalist eliminated. The ten remaining contestants presented a solo performance following Abel's elimination.

December 11 – The Finals 

The Winners were announced the public vote chose Brian Cruz and Taishmara Rivera as the two most voted contestants making them the first two members to join the band. Then the judges chose the next two members which were Christian Castro and Danelly Hoyer. The final member was chosen by the public which was Garmandy Candelario. The band's named was announced as Mix5.

References

External links 
Official website

2016 American television seasons